Attock Khurd Railway Station (Urdu and ) is located in the village of Attock Khurd, Attock district, Punjab province, Pakistan.

Special train excursions have operated to this station.

Services
The following trains originate/stop at Attock Khurd station:

See also
 List of railway stations in Pakistan
 Pakistan Railways

References

Railway stations in Attock District
Railway stations on Karachi–Peshawar Line (ML 1)